Return of the Living Dead is the third studio album by American rapper E.S.G. from Houston, Texas. It was released on February 24, 1998 via Black Hearted Records and has sold about 6000 units. The album peaked at No. 67 on the Top R&B/Hip-Hop Albums chart in the US Billboard charts.

Track listing

Charts

References

External links

1998 albums
E.S.G. (rapper) albums